Burgkirchen is a municipality in the district Braunau am Inn in the Austrian state of Upper Austria.

Geography
Burgkirchen lies in the Innviertel. About 30 percent of the municipality is forest and 61 percent farmland. It is also close the river Inn and is 8 km from the Austria–Germany border.

References

Cities and towns in Braunau am Inn District